Gustave Césaire Garaud (25 July 1844, Toulon – 23 June 1914, Nice) was a French painter of landscapes, in traditional style.

Biography 
He was a student of François-Louis Français. His first exhibit at the Salon came in 1878, and he would continue to have showings there until his death. In 1889, he was awarded two third-class medals and, in 1893, two second-class medals.

He opened a workshop in Paris, dividing his time between painting there, in Provence and in Brittany. He also created some landscapes in Corsica. Although he never became famous, he enjoyed a good reputation among collectors and was able to organize two exhibits of his own, at the Cercle Volney, in 1891 and 1900. In addition to his canvases, he decorated some private buildings.

During this time, he travelled widely; especially to what was then French Indochina.

As he grew older, he decided to leave Paris and settle in Nice, where he established a studio and taught drawing. He died there, aged seventy.

Sources 
 André Alauzen and Laurent Noet, Dictionnaire des peintres et sculpteurs de Provence-Alpes-Côte d'Azur, Jeanne Laffitte, 2006 
 , his personal journal @ Mémoire Vive, Ville de Besançon

External links 

 More works by Garaud @ ArtNet

1844 births
1914 deaths
20th-century French painters
French landscape painters
French illustrators
Artists from Toulon
19th-century French painters